Uno Erik Wilhelm Willers (20 October 1911 – 10 January 1980) was a Swedish historian and librarian. He served as National Librarian of Sweden from 1952 to 1977.

Early life
Willers was born on 20 October 1911 in Stockholm, Sweden, the son of Einar Willers, a police judge, and his wife Malin (née Dahlgren). He passed studentexamen in 1931 and worked at the Karolinska Institute's library from 1931 to 1936. Willers attended the University of Marburg in 1933 and earned a Bachelor of Arts degree in 1936 and studied history and library science in Geneva in 1937 and 1938 and in Berlin from 1938 to 1939 when he earned a Licentiate degree.

Career

Willers worked at the Riksdag Library from 1941 to 1942 and the National Library of Sweden from 1942. He was also a member of the Swedish Society for Personal History from 1943. Willers was a member of the Swedish intelligence agency C-byrån during World War II.

He then served as docent in history at Stockholm University College from 1945 to 1950 and from 1946 to 1947 Willers served as librarian at the Sainte-Geneviève Library in Paris. He was director of the Nobel Library of the Swedish Academy from 1946 to 1950 and was deputy director and head of the Ministry for Foreign Affairs' archives from 1950 to 1952. Willers was appointed National Librarian of Sweden and head of the National Library of Sweden in 1952.

Willers became a reserve officer in 1938 and lieutenant of the Swedish Army Quartermaster Corps' reserve in 1938 and captain of the same in 1946. In 1947, he was appointed secretary in the Swedish Academy's Nobel Committee, a position he held until 1967. He was a member of the working committee of the Swedish National Commission for UNESCO from 1954 to 1959 and its vice chairman from 1954 to 1959. He was board member of the Office of the Chancellor of the Swedish Universities from 1964 and chairman of the board of the Research Library Council from 1964.

Personal life
In 1939, he married Greta Bellinder (born 1917), the daughter of the Justice of the Supreme Court of Sweden, Sven Bellinder and Karin (née Gustafsson). He was the father of Catharina (born 1939), Erik (born 1942), Margareta (born 1944) and Ulric (born 1948).

Awards and decorations
   Commander of the Order of the Polar Star
   Grand Officer of the Order of Merit of the Federal Republic of Germany
   Grand Knight's Cross of the Order of the Falcon (18 March 1953)
   Commander of the Order of St. Olav (1 July 1952)
   Knight of the Legion of Honour
   Illis quorum

Honors
Member of the Royal Society for Publication of Manuscripts on Scandinavian History (Kungliga Samfundet för utgivande av handskrifter rörande Skandinaviens historia) (1952)
Member of the Royal Swedish Academy of Sciences
Member of the Royal Skyttean Society
Honorary member of the Royal Swedish Society of Naval Sciences

References

External links

Bibliography at LIBRIS
Article in Svensk tidskrift 

1911 births
1980 deaths
Swedish librarians
Members of the Royal Swedish Academy of Sciences
Members of the Royal Swedish Society of Naval Sciences
People of the C-byrån
People from Stockholm
University of Marburg alumni
Academic staff of Stockholm University
Commanders of the Order of the Polar Star
Knights Commander of the Order of Merit of the Federal Republic of Germany
Recipients of the Illis quorum